Ripple Labs, Inc. is an American technology company which develops the Ripple payment protocol and exchange network. Originally named Opencoin and renamed in 2015, the company was founded in 2012 and is based in San Francisco, California.

History
Ryan Fugger conceived Ripple in 2004 after working on a local exchange trading system in Vancouver. The intent was to create a monetary system that was decentralized and could effectively empower individuals and communities to create their own money. Fugger later built the first iteration of this system, RipplePay.com. Concurrently, in May 2011, Jed McCaleb began developing a digital currency system in which transactions were verified by consensus among members of the network, rather than by the mining process used by Bitcoin. In August 2012, Jed McCaleb hired Chris Larsen and they approached Ryan Fugger with their digital currency idea. After discussions with McCaleb and long-standing members of the Ripple community, Fugger handed over the reins. In September 2012, Chris Larsen and Jed McCaleb co-founded the corporation OpenCoin.

OpenCoin began development of the ripple protocol (RTXP) and the Ripple payment and exchange network. On April 11, 2013, OpenCoin announced it had closed an angel round of funding with several venture capital firms. That same month, OpenCoin acquired SimpleHoney to help it popularize virtual currencies and make them easier for average users.

On September 26, 2013, OpenCoin officially changed its name to Ripple Labs, Inc.

On May 5, 2015, Ripple received a  civil money penalty from U.S. Treasury's Financial Crimes Enforcement Network (FinCEN) for “willful violation of the Bank Secrecy Act by acting as a money services business without registering with FinCEN.” On October 6, 2015, the company was rebranded from Ripple Labs to Ripple.

On June 13, 2016, Ripple obtained a virtual currency license from the New York State Department of Financial Services, making it the fourth company with a BitLicense.

In September 2017, R3 sued Ripple for specific performance of an option agreement in which Ripple agreed to sell up to five billion XRPs for a price of $.0085. Ripple countersued, claiming that R3 reneged on a number of contractual promises, and was simply acting in a spirit of opportunism, after the cryptocurrency increased in value more than 30 times. In September 2018, Ripple and R3 reached an undisclosed settlement agreement.

In March 2018, a Japanese bank consortium led by SBI Ripple Asia, comprising 61 banks launched "MoneyTap", a Ripple-powered mobile app to provide on-demand domestic payments in Japan. In May 2018, Spanish Banking group Santander released One Pay FX — the first mobile application for international payments powered by blockchain technology, that uses Ripple's xCurrent technology. Following the creation of a Mumbai office, Ripple has been adding multiple Indian customers in 2018, including leading banks such as Kotak Mahindra Bank, Axis Bank, and IndusInd, that announced that they started using Ripple's products.

On December 22, 2020, the U.S. Securities and Exchange Commission charged Ripple and two of its executives with violating investor protection laws.  The SEC alleged that Ripple, co-founder Christian Larsen and CEO Bradley Garlinghouse, raised more than $1.3 billion through an unregistered securities offering. The government agency brought charges against Ripple for the fault of depriving the “potential purchasers [of XRP] of adequate disclosures about XRP and Ripple’s business and other important long-standing protections that are fundamental to our robust public market system,” according to the complaint that the SEC filed in federal district court in Manhattan, New York. In April 2021, Judge Sarah Netburn granted a motion from Garlinghouse and Larsen to dismiss the SEC's subpoenas for access to eight years' of banking records, referring to the request as a "wholly inappropriate overreach." The defendants have already agreed to turn over all data involving XRP transactions.

Funding
The primary source of funding Ripple has been sales of the XRP cryptocurrency. According to its own records it sold 
$1,254.54 million worth of XRP between Q4 2016 and Q2 2020, to a mix of institutional investors and retail investors via sales on cryptocurrency exchanges.

Ripple is a privately funded company. It has closed five rounds of funding, which included two rounds of angel funding, one round of seed funding, one Series A round, one Series B round and one Series C round.

Ripple's revenue sources include professional services provided to financial network operators being integrated with Ripple, software built to integrate legacy financial systems with Ripple and the native currency (XRP). Ripple (a private company registered in Delaware) chooses not to reveal information to the public about sales revenues from software and professional services.

Programs and projects

Charitable contributions
Of the 80 billion XRP that Ripple Labs was gifted, Ripple follows a distribution strategy that encompasses payments to business partners such as gateways, market makers and charitable organizations.

Ripple Labs began working with the World Community Grid in November 2013. The World Community Grid pools surplus processing power from volunteers’ computers and electronic devices to support humanitarian causes such as fighting AIDS, improving solar energy and defeating cancer. Individuals who join the Ripple Labs team and donate their spare processing power are rewarded with XRP. As of March 18, 2014, Ripple Labs has given away 134,528,800 XRP through the World Community Grid at a rate of 1,250,000 XRP per day.

In 2018, Ripple has made multiple donations. The company has donated $29 million of XRP to USA public schools, and $4 million to The Ellen DeGeneres Wildlife Fund

Partnerships and initiatives
In March 2014, CrossCoin Ventures launched an accelerator which funds companies that work to advance the Ripple ecosystem. Mentorship and support is provided by CrossCoin and Ripple Labs, Inc.

Ripple also developed early partnerships with companies such as ZipZap, with the relationship called a threat to Western Union in the press.

In cooperation with other industry leaders, Ripple Labs became a co-founding member of the Digital Asset Transfer Authority (DATA) in July 2013. DATA provides best practices and technical standards, including anti-money laundering compliance guidance for companies that work with digital currency and other emerging payments systems. The committee works as a liaison among public officials, businesses and consumers and create common rules to protect consumers. The initiative attempts to create a cohesive voice of Bitcoin community members when interacting with regulators.

In June 2018, Ripple has committed over $50 million in funding to create the University Blockchain Research Initiative, which aims at support research to:

Collaborate on research and technical development that will stimulate widespread understanding and innovation in blockchain.
Create new curriculum to meet high student demand for learning about blockchain, cryptocurrency and other FinTech topics.
Stimulate ideas and dialog among students, faculty, technologists and business leaders on topics of shared interest.

In May 2018, Ripple has announced "an initiative by Ripple that will invest in, incubate, acquire and provide grants to companies and projects that [...] will use the digital asset XRP and the XRP Ledger, the open-sourced, decentralized technology behind XRP, to solve their customers’ problems.".

In March 2019, Ripple announced a $100 Million fund for gaming developers which would be overseen by Forte.

Awards and recognitions
For its creation and development of the ripple protocol (RTXP) and the Ripple payment/exchange network, the magazine MIT Technology Review recognized Ripple Labs as one of 2014s 50 Smartest Companies in its February 2014 issue. The criteria for the recognition revolved around "whether a company had made strides in the past year that will define its field."

On February 9, 2014, Ripple Labs was named as a finalist for a 2014 PYMNTS Innovator Award in two separate categories: Best New Technology as well as Most Disruptive Company. The recognition pertains to Ripple Labs work in creating Ripple, an open-source, distributed payment protocol powering a new global value web.

On January 12, 2016, Ripple was listed by UK-based company Richtopia at No. 8 in the list of 100 Most Influential Blockchain Organisations.

Other Awards:

 February 2015 - Fast Company. The World's Top 10 Most Innovative Companies Of 2015 In Money.
 February 2015 - American Banker. 20 Fintech Companies to Watch.
 August 2015 - Ripple Labs Awarded as Technology Pioneer by World Economic Forum.
 December 2015 - Forbes. Fintech 50.
 December 2015 - H2 Ventures, KPMG. Fintech 100.
 March 2016 - PYMNTS Innovation Project 2016. Best B2B Innovation Award.
 June 2016 - Fortune. 5 Hottest Companies in Fintech.

Controversies
On May 5, 2015, FinCEN fined Ripple Labs and XRP II US$700,000 for violation of the Bank Secrecy Act, based on the Financial Crimes Enforcement Network's anti-money laundering (AML) additions to the act in 2013. According to the FinCEN announcement: "Ripple Labs willfully violated several requirements of the Bank Secrecy Act (BSA) by acting as a money services business (MSB) and selling its virtual currency, known as XRP, without registering with FinCEN, and by failing to implement and maintain an adequate anti-money laundering (AML) program designed to protect its products from use by money launderers or terrorist financiers."

Ripple Labs agreed to remedial steps to ensure future compliance, which included an agreement to only transact XRP and "Ripple Trade" activity through registered money services businesses (MSB), among other agreements such as enhancing the Ripple Protocol. It has been argued that the changes made to the protocol did not change the protocol itself, but instead added AML transaction monitoring to the network and improve transaction analysis. However the FinCen statement clearly indicated that Ripple itself was making changes to the protocol as a result of the enforcement action. "Ripple Labs will also undertake certain enhancements to the Ripple Protocol to appropriately monitor all future transactions."

Ripple executives, including CTO David Schwartz, have admitted the software that is sold to banks for payments processing, XCurrent, is not a blockchain or any form of distributed ledger. Schwartz described it as “bi-directional messaging” that can eventually plug into distributed ledgers, but xCurrent’s technology itself “is not a distributed ledger.”

In May 2018, Stewart Hosie MP, at a UK parliamentary inquiry into digital currencies, questioned Ryan Zagone of Ripple about the value and nature of the XRP Cryptocurrency: "...but the point that was made earlier, Mr Zagone, is that if people buy XRP—a financial asset—from Ripple Labs, it does not entitle them to an ownership stake, there is no right to be converted back into conventional currencies and it does not pay any return. It also seemingly has no purpose. Is that simply to avoid XRP looking like a security or an equity, and to avoid the necessary regulation?" 

Ripple claims to be completely separate from and have no control over the XRP cryptocurrency, in spite of the FinCen press release describing XRP as "its virtual currency, known as XRP". However Ripple controls the vast majority of the supply of XRP and, according to its own published records, earns the majority of its income from selling XRP. They do own a lot of XRP but the network is not based on PoS, therefore the amount of XRP do not determine how much control you have over the network. The XRP Ledger has its own consensus algorithm with over 39 entities included in the overlap of all the currently published and used UNLs.

In 2018 CEO claimed on multiple occasions that by end of that year "major banks" would be using Ripple tools that made use of the XRP cryptocurrency and that by end of 2019 "dozens" of banks would be using XRP.  Both claims by the end of 2019 were proven to be untrue. At a conference in June 2019, Hikmet Ersek, CEO of Western Union, commented that his company had experimented with Ripple in 2018 but had chosen not to adopt their cryptocurrency based payments software because, “It’s five times more expensive”, than using their existing infrastructure.

In 2018 and 2019 Garlinghouse claimed on multiple occasions that the published error rate for SWIFT messaging was at least 6%, this was shown to be untrue by research published by the London School of Economics Business Review that showed Garlinghouse's claims were based on mis-reading of a paper published by SWIFT  that did not refer to error rates in messaging.

In February 2020 an article in Financial Times Alphaville revealed that Moneygram, the largest public user of Ripple's XRP based liquidity tools, has not only received a $50m investment prior to adopting the tools but that the software was provided free of charge by Ripple and that Moneygram was receiving an on-going subsidy for using XRP, amounting to $8.9m in Q4 2019. The same article revealed that Ripple was dependent on sales of XRP to remain profitable.

In October 2020, Ripple board member Ken Kurson resigned from the company when he was charged with committing a range of cyber-crimes by the United States Attorney for the southern district of New York.

References

External links
 Ripple.com

Software companies based in California
Cryptocurrencies
2012 establishments in the United States
Software companies of the United States
2012 establishments in California
Software companies established in 2012
Companies established in 2012